The 2015 Jordan Super Cup was the 33rd edition of the Jordan Super Cup. It was played on 21 August 2015 at Amman International Stadium in Amman, Jordan. The game was played between the 2014–15 league champion Al-Wehdat and the 2014–15 Cup winner Al-Faisaly. Al-Faisaly won 1-0.

Match

Details

See also 

 2014–15 Jordan League
 2014–15 Jordan FA Cup

References 

http://www.kooora.com/?n=426817&pg=1&o=n8139
http://www.alweehdat.net/vb/showthread.php?t=111857

2014–15 in Jordanian football
2015